Andrea Jean Hayes (born January 12, 1969), later known by her married name Andrea Dickson, is an American former competition swimmer who represented the United States at the 1988 Summer Olympics in Seoul, South Korea.  At the 1988 Olympics, she finished sixth in the final of the women's 200-meter backstroke event, with a time of 2:15.02.

She is best known for winning a gold medal in the 200-meter backstroke at the inaugural 1985 Pan Pacific Swimming Championships in Tokyo, Japan.

See also
 List of University of Texas at Austin alumni

References
 

1969 births
Living people
American female backstroke swimmers
Olympic swimmers of the United States
Swimmers at the 1988 Summer Olympics
Texas Longhorns women's swimmers
Place of birth missing (living people)